David Leslie Gilson Lavis (born 27 June 1951, Bedford, England) is an English drummer and portrait artist. He gained fame as the drummer with band Squeeze in the 1970s and 80s. Lavis is currently the drummer for Jools Holland's Rhythm and Blues Orchestra, with former Squeeze bandmate Jools Holland.

Before joining Squeeze, he had already built up a substantial amount of experience, having toured with Chuck Berry, Jerry Lee Lewis and Dolly Parton. He was working in a brickyard when he noticed the advertisement in Melody Maker for Squeeze.

Lavis now tours around the United Kingdom with Jools Holland, his long-term musical partner. They both appeared (uncredited) as members of "The Nice Twelve" in the 1994 partially-improvised comedy film There's No Business... starring Raw Sex (Simon Brint and Rowland Rivron) and The Oblivion Boys.

Lavis is also a portrait artist having had several exhibitions in London and the home counties. He has painted numerous musicians including Lily Allen, Paloma Faith, Lulu and Smokey Robinson.

References

External links
 Official website
 [ Gilson Lavis] at Allmusic
 

1951 births
Living people
English rock drummers
People from Bedford
Squeeze (band) members
Male actors from Bedfordshire
Jools Holland's Rhythm and Blues Orchestra members